The 2010 Suzuka GT 300km was the first round of the 2010 Super GT season. It took place on March 21, 2010.

Race

References

Suzuka GT 300km